Silvania is a town and municipality in Cundinamarca Department, Colombia.

References

Municipalities of Cundinamarca Department